Héctor Anibal Ávalos Tobar (born April 9, 1978 in El Salvador) is a Salvadoran footballer who currently plays for Once Municipal in the Primera División de Fútbol de El Salvador.

Club career
Ávalos started his career in 1994 with hometown club Once Municipal in the Second division until leaving for Juventud Olimpia Metalio in 1999. He then made his debut in the Premier division with Alianza in 2000 and joined Arcense 2 years later. After a second spell at Once Municipal, he moved on to big club  FAS only to return to Once Municipal again in 2010.

International career
Ávalos made his debut for El Salvador in a November 2006 friendly match against Panama and has earned a total of 3 caps, scoring no goals. He has represented his country at the 2007 UNCAF Nations Cup.

His final international was the February 2007 UNCAF Cup match against Guatemala.

References

External links

1978 births
Living people
People from Ahuachapán
Association football midfielders
Salvadoran footballers
El Salvador international footballers
Once Municipal footballers
Alianza F.C. footballers
C.D. FAS footballers
2007 UNCAF Nations Cup players